Park Layne is a census-designated place (CDP) in Clark County, Ohio, United States. The area is also referred to as Park Layne Manor. The population of the CDP was 4,343 at the 2010 census. It is part of the Springfield, Ohio Metropolitan Statistical Area. At 9:17 pm on May 24, 2017, an EF1 tornado touched down and caused damage to several business in the community.

Geography
Park Layne is located in southwestern Clark County on the western edge of Bethel Township. It is bordered to the east by unincorporated Crystal Lakes and to the west by Bethel Township in Miami County. Park Layne Elementary School is located in the northwest corner of the CDP.

Ohio State Route 235 (South Dayton-Lakeview Road) passes through the community, leading north  to New Carlisle and south  to Interstate 70 at Exit 41.

Demographics

As of the census of 2000, there were 4,519 people, 1,588 households, and 1,259 families residing in the CDP. The population density was 3,036.5 people per square mile (1,171.0/km2). There were 1,644 housing units at an average density of 1,104.7/sq mi (426.0/km2). The racial makeup of the CDP was 96.59% White, 0.46% African American, 0.38% Native American, 0.27% Asian, 0.38% from other races, and 1.93% from two or more races. Hispanic or Latino of any race were 1.46% of the population.

There were 1,588 households, out of which 41.5% had children under the age of 18 living with them, 57.5% were married couples living together, 15.2% had a female householder with no husband present, and 20.7% were non-families. 17.5% of all households were made up of individuals, and 6.0% had someone living alone who was 65 years of age or older. The average household size was 2.85 and the average family size was 3.17.

In the CDP the population was spread out, with 30.4% under the age of 18, 9.9% from 18 to 24, 30.5% from 25 to 44, 20.6% from 45 to 64, and 8.7% who were 65 years of age or older. The median age was 32 years. For every 100 females there were 95.8 males. For every 100 females age 18 and over, there were 92.2 males.

The median income for a household in the CDP was $38,699, and the median income for a family was $40,000. Males had a median income of $35,264 versus $23,333 for females. The per capita income for the CDP was $15,244. About 6.2% of families and 6.6% of the population were below the poverty line, including 5.9% of those under age 18 and 7.4% of those age 65 or over.

References

Census-designated places in Clark County, Ohio